Josef Steffes-Mies (13 May 1940 – 26 July 2021) was a West German rower who represented the United Team of Germany. He competed at the 1964 Summer Olympics in Tokyo with the men's double sculls where they came fifth.

References

External links
 

1940 births
2021 deaths
West German male rowers
Olympic rowers of the United Team of Germany
Rowers at the 1964 Summer Olympics
Sportspeople from Essen
World Rowing Championships medalists for West Germany